2022 Somalia attacks may refer to:

 February 2022 Beledweyne bombing
 March 2022 Somalia attacks
 April 2022 Mogadishu bombing
 August 2022 Mogadishu attack
 October 2022 Beledweyne bombings
 October 2022 Mogadishu bombings
 November 2022 Mogadishu attack

See also 
 2022 timeline of the Somali Civil War